The Palestine Athletic Federation is the governing body for the sport of athletics in the State of Palestine. The organisation is maintained by the PLE Olympic Committee headquartered at Al Nazir Street, in Gaza City. It is a member of the Arab Athletics Federation, and holds tasks such as providing track suits for male and female Palestinian athletes that compete at outdoor and indoor track and field events, their transportation costs and sports equipment.

See also
European Athletic Association

References

External links 
 Official website 

Athletics in the State of Palestine
Sports organizations established in 1964
National members of the International Association of Athletics Federations